Byron G. Highland (February 8, 1934 – February 21, 1967) was a United States Marine Corps combat photographer during the Vietnam War who was killed by a landmine alongside the war correspondent and historian Bernard B. Fall while observing Operation Chinook II on the Street Without Joy, Thừa Thiên Province on 21 February 1967, leaving behind his wife, and two sons and a daughter from a previous marriage.

The last few minutes which the two spent together are documented in Fall's posthumously published book 
Last Reflections on a War, via a tape recorder Fall was dictating into just prior to the explosion.

Born in Detroit, he entered the Marines in 1953, and also served in the Korean War.

His eldest son, Kenneth E. Highland, later recorded a song with the punk band Johnny and the Jumper Cables, entitled "Landmine", about his father's death.

See also
 List of journalists killed and missing in the Vietnam War

References

Landmine victims
United States Marine Corps personnel of the Korean War
American military personnel killed in the Vietnam War
War photographers killed while covering the Vietnam War
1934 births
1967 deaths
United States Marine Corps personnel of the Vietnam War
United States Marine Corps non-commissioned officers